Krien may refer to:

People
 Anna Krien, Australian journalist and author
  (born 1975), German actress
 Ferdinand Krien, German diplomat
  (1873–1935), German cinematographer
 Werner Krien (1912–1975), German cinematographer

Places
 Krien, Mecklenburg-Vorpommern, Germany
 Krien, German name of Krzynia, Poland
 Krien, Atzesberg, Austria
 Krien, Putzleinsdorf, Austria
 Krien, Rohrbach-Berg, Austria